(nirvāṇa ; Pali: nibbāna; Prakrit: ṇivvāṇa; literally, "blown out", as in an oil lamp) is a concept in Indian religions (Buddhism, Hinduism, Jainism, and Sikhism) that represents the ultimate state of soteriological release, the liberation from duḥkha, suffering, and saṃsāra, the cycle of birth and rebirth.

In Indian religions, nirvana is synonymous with moksha and mukti. All Indian religions assert it to be a state of perfect quietude, freedom, highest happiness as well as the liberation from attachment and worldly suffering and the ending of samsara, the round of existence. However, non-Buddhist and Buddhist traditions describe these terms for liberation differently. In Hindu philosophy, it is the union of or the realization of the identity of Atman with Brahman, depending on the Hindu tradition. In Jainism, nirvana is also the soteriological goal, representing the release of a soul from karmic bondage and samsara. In the Buddhist context, nirvana refers to the abandonment of the 10 fetters, marking the end of rebirth by stilling the fires that keep the process of rebirth going. To achieve this status, one has to get rid of three psychological evils – Raga (greed, desire), Dwesha (anger) and Moha (delusion).

Etymology 
The ideas of spiritual liberation, with the concept of soul and Brahman, appear in Vedic texts and Upanishads, such as in verse 4.4.6 of the Brihadaranyaka Upanishad. 

The term nirvana in the soteriological sense of "blown out, extinguished" state of liberation appears at many places in Vedas particularly in Bhagavata Purana, however populist opinion does not give credit to either the Vedas or the Upanishads. Erroneously Collins states, "the Buddhists seem to have been the first to call it nirvana." This may have been deliberate use of words in early Buddhism, suggests Collins, since Atman and Brahman were described in Vedic texts and Upanishads with the imagery of fire, as something good, desirable and liberating. Collins says the word nirvāṇa is from the verbal root  "blow" in the form of past participle  "blown", prefixed with the preverb  meaning "out". Hence the original meaning of the word is "blown out, extinguished". (Sandhi changes the sounds: the v of  causes  to become , and then the r of  causes retroflexion of the following n: + > nirvāṇa). However the Buddhist meaning of nirvana also has other interpretations.

L. S. Cousins said that in popular usage nirvana was "the goal of Buddhist discipline,... the final removal of the disturbing mental elements which obstruct a peaceful and clear state of mind, together with a state of awakening from the mental sleep which they induce."

Overview
Nirvāṇa is a term found in the texts of all major Indian religions – Hinduism, Jainism Buddhism, and Sikhism. It refers to the profound peace of mind that is acquired with moksha, liberation from samsara, or release from a state of suffering, after respective spiritual practice or sādhanā.

The liberation from Saṃsāra developed as an ultimate goal and soteriological value in the Indian culture, and called by different terms such as nirvana, moksha, mukti and kaivalya. This basic scheme underlies Hinduism, Jainism and Buddhism, where "the ultimate aim is the timeless state of moksa, or, as the Buddhists first seem to have called it, nirvana." Although the term occurs in the literatures of a number of ancient Indian traditions, the concept is most commonly associated with Buddhism. Some writers believe the concept was adopted by other Indian religions after it became established in Buddhism, but with different meanings and description, for instance the use of (Moksha) in the Hindu text Bhagavad Gita of the Mahabharata.

The idea of moksha is connected to the Vedic culture, where it conveyed a notion of amrtam, "immortality", and also a notion of a timeless, "unborn", or "the still point of the turning world of time". It was also its timeless structure, the whole underlying "the spokes of the invariable but incessant wheel of time". The hope for life after death started with notions of going to the worlds of the Fathers or Ancestors and/or the world of the Gods or Heaven.

The earliest Vedic texts incorporate the concept of life, followed by an afterlife in heaven and hell based on cumulative virtues (merit) or vices (demerit). However, the ancient Vedic Rishis challenged this idea of afterlife as simplistic, because people do not live an equally moral or immoral life. Between generally virtuous lives, some are more virtuous; while evil too has degrees, and either permanent heaven or permanent hell is disproportionate. The Vedic thinkers introduced the idea of an afterlife in heaven or hell in proportion to one's merit, and when this runs out, one returns and is reborn. The idea of rebirth following "running out of merit" appears in Buddhist texts as well. This idea appears in many ancient and medieval texts, as  Saṃsāra, or the endless cycle of life, death, rebirth and redeath, such as section 6:31 of the Mahabharata and verse 9.21 of the Bhagavad Gita. The Saṃsara, the life after death, and what impacts rebirth came to be seen as dependent on karma.

Buddhism 

Nirvana (nibbana) literally means "blowing out" or "quenching". It is the most used as well as the earliest term to describe the soteriological goal in Buddhism: release from the cycle of rebirth (saṃsāra). Nirvana is part of the Third Truth on "cessation of dukkha" in the Four Noble Truths doctrine of Buddhism. It is the goal of the Noble Eightfold Path.

The Buddha is believed in the Buddhist scholastic tradition to have realized two types of nirvana, one at enlightenment, and another at his death.

In the Buddhist tradition, nirvana is described as the extinguishing of the fires that cause rebirths and associated suffering. The Buddhist texts identify these "three fires" or "three poisons" as raga (greed, sensuality), dvesha (aversion, hate) and avidyā or moha (ignorance, delusion).

The state of nirvana is also described in Buddhism as cessation of all afflictions, cessation of all actions, cessation of rebirths and suffering that are a consequence of afflictions and actions. Liberation is described as identical to anatta (non-self, lack of any self). In Buddhism, liberation is achieved when all things and beings are understood to be with no Self. Nirvana is also described as identical to achieving sunyata (emptiness), where there is no essence or fundamental nature in anything, and everything is empty.

In time, with the development of Buddhist doctrine, other interpretations were given, such as being an unconditioned state, a fire going out for lack of fuel, abandoning weaving (vana) together of life after life, and the elimination of desire. However, Buddhist texts have asserted since ancient times that nirvana is more than "destruction of desire", it is "the object of the knowledge" of the Buddhist path.

Hinduism 
The most ancient texts of Hinduism such as the Vedas and early Upanishads don't mention the soteriological term Nirvana. This term is found in texts such as the Bhagavad Gita and the Nirvana Upanishad, likely composed in the post-Buddha era. The concept of Nirvana is described differently in Buddhist and Hindu literature. Hinduism has the concept of Atman – the soul, self – asserted to exist in every living being, while Buddhism asserts through its anatman doctrine that there is no Atman in any being. Nirvana in Buddhism is "stilling mind, cessation of desires, and action" unto emptiness, states Jeaneane Fowler, while nirvana in post-Buddhist Hindu texts is also "stilling mind but not inaction" and "not emptiness", rather it is the knowledge of true Self (Atman) and the acceptance of its universality and unity with Brahman.

Moksha 

The ancient soteriological concept in Hinduism is moksha, described as the liberation from the cycle of birth and death through self-knowledge and the eternal connection of Atman (soul, self) and metaphysical Brahman. Moksha is derived from the root  which means free, let go, release, liberate; Moksha means "liberation, freedom, emancipation of the soul". In the Vedas and early Upanishads, the word mucyate appears, which means to be set free or release - such as of a horse from its harness.

Brahma-nirvana in the Bhagavad Gita 
The term Brahma-nirvana appears in verses 2.72 and 5.24-26 of the Bhagavad Gita. It is the state of release or liberation; the union with the Brahman. According to Easwaran, it is an experience of blissful egolessness.

According to Zaehner, Johnson and other scholars, nirvana in the Gita is a Buddhist term adopted by the Hindus. Zaehner states it was used in Hindu texts for the first time in the Bhagavad Gita, and that the idea therein in verse 2.71-72 to "suppress one's desires and ego" is also Buddhist. According to Johnson the term nirvana is borrowed from the Buddhists to confuse the Buddhists, by linking the Buddhist nirvana state to the pre-Buddhist Vedic tradition of metaphysical absolute called Brahman.

According to Mahatma Gandhi, the Hindu and Buddhist understanding of nirvana are different because the nirvana of the Buddhists is shunyata, emptiness, but the nirvana of the Gita means peace and that is why it is described as brahma-nirvana (oneness with Brahman).

Jainism 

The terms moksa and nirvana are often used interchangeably in the Jain texts.

Uttaradhyana Sutra provides an account of Sudharman – also called Gautama, and one of the disciples of Mahavira – explaining the meaning of nirvana to Kesi, a disciple of Parshva.

Sikhism
The concept of liberation as "extinction of suffering", along with the idea of sansara as the "cycle of rebirth" is also part of Sikhism. Nirvana appears in Sikh texts as the term Nirban. However, the more common term is Mukti or Moksh, a salvation concept wherein loving devotion to God is emphasized for liberation from endless cycle of rebirths.
In sikhism Nirvana is not an after life concept but a goal for the living.  Furthermore Sikh nirvana/mukti is achieved thru devotion to satguru/truth who sets you free from reincarnation bharam/superstition/false belief.

Manichaenism
The term Nirvana (also mentioned is parinirvana) is in the 13th or 14th century Manichaean work "The great song to Mani" and "The story of the Death of Mani", referring to the realm of light.

See also

 Ataraxia
 Baqaa
 Bodhi
 Dzogchen
 Enlightenment (spiritual)
 God in Buddhism
 Jannah (Islam)
 Jnana
 Monastic silence
 Nirguna
 Nirvana fallacy
 Satori
 Salvation
 Shangri-La
 Śūnyatā
 Yoga
 Zen

Notes

References

Online references

Sources

Further reading 
 
 Kawamura (1981). Bodhisattva Doctrine in Buddhism. Wilfrid Laurier University Press.
 
 Nananaranda, Katukurunde (2012). Nibbana - The Mind Stilled (Vol. I-VII). Dharma Grantha Mudrana Bharaya.
 
 Yogi Kanna (2011). Nirvana: Absolute Freedom. Kamath Publishings.

External links 

 Nibbana-The Mind Stilled Vol. I : Sermons on Nibbana (PDF)
 English translation of the Mahayana Mahaparinirvana Sutra

Moksha
Buddhist philosophical concepts
Hindu philosophical concepts
Jain philosophical concepts
Sikh philosophical concepts
Salvation
Mystical union